Sloboda Ukraine, or Slobozhanshchyna, is a historical region, now located in Northeastern Ukraine and Southwestern Russia. It developed and flourished in the 17th and 18th centuries on the southwestern frontier of the Tsardom of Russia. In 1765, it was converted into the Sloboda Ukraine Governorate.

Etymology
The name derives from the term sloboda for a colonial settlement free of tax obligations, and the word ukraine in its original sense of "borderland". The etymology of the word Ukraine is seen this way among Russian, Ukrainian and Western historians such as Orest Subtelny, Paul Magocsi, Omeljan Pritsak, Mykhailo Hrushevskyi, Ivan Ohiyenko, Petro Tolochko and others. It is supported by the Encyclopedia of Ukraine and the Etymological dictionary of the Ukrainian language.

Geographical extent
The territory of historic Sloboda Ukraine corresponds to the territory of the present-day Ukrainian oblast (province) of Kharkiv (in its entirety), and parts of the Sumy, Donetsk, and Luhansk Oblasts, as well as parts of the Belgorod, Kursk, and Voronezh Oblasts of Russia.

History

Russia gained control over the territory as the result of conquests against the Grand Duchy of Lithuania during the Muscovite–Lithuanian Wars in the 16th century.

According to Russian and Ukrainian sources of the 16th-17th centuries, the region was initially part of the Russian state, which encouraged the settlement of this territory for defensive purposes. It was first colonised by the Russians in the first half of the 16th century and became part of a defense line used against Tatar raiding. A second wave of colonisation came in the 1620–1630s, largely in the form of Ukrainian Cossack regiments, who were allowed to settle there in order to help protect the territory against the Tatars.

The Cossacks who arrived in Sloboda Ukraine were under the sovereignty of Russian tsars and their military chancellery and were registered in Russian military service. A great number of Ukrainian refugees arrived from Poland-Lithuania after the rebellion of 1637-1638 and received generous resettlement subsidies from the Russian government. For decades, Ukrainian cossacks were crossing the border into southern Russia to gather livestock, but many of them were also entering for banditry, so that Russia had to build a new garrison town on the Boguchar River in an attempt to defend the land from Ukrainian bands and resettled many of the Ukrainian refugees at Valuyki, Korocha, Voronezh and as far as Kozlov.

Crimean Tatars and Nogai Tatars traditionally used the sparsely inhabited area of the Wild Fields on the south border of Russia immediately south of Severia to launch annual raids into the Russian territories along the Muravsky Trail and Izyum Trail. In 1591, a Tatar raid reached the Moscow region, forcing the Russian government to build new forts of Belgorod and Oskol in 1593, Yelets in 1592, Kromy in 1595, Kursk in 1597, Tsarev-Borisov and Valuyki in 1600. Tsarev-Borisov, named after Tsar Boris I, was the oldest settlement in Sloboda Ukraine.

During those raids regions near Ryazan and along Oka River suffered the most. With the Russian territorial expansion south and east into the lands of modern Sloboda Ukraine and mid-Volga River the conflict intensified. Sometime between 1580s and 1640s the Belgorod Defense Line with number of fortifications, moats, and forts was constructed in Sloboda Ukraine, providing security to the region. After a number of Russo-Crimean Wars, the Russian monarchs started to encourage the settlement of the region by Cossacks who acted as a sort of frontier guard force against the raids of the Tatars.

Apart from the Cossacks, the settlers included peasants and townspeople from Right and Left-bank Ukraine, divided by the Treaty of Andrusovo in 1667. The name Sloboda Ukraine derives from the word sloboda, a Slavic term meaning "freedom" (or "liberty)", and also the name of a type of settlement. The Tsar would free the settlers of a sloboda from the obligation of paying taxes and fees for a certain period of time, which proved very enticing for settlers. By the end of the 18th century, settlers occupied 523 slobodas (slobody) in Sloboda Ukraine.

From 1650 to 1765, the territory referred to as Sloboda Ukraine became increasingly organized according to Cossack military custom, similar to that of the Zaporozhian Host and Don Host. The relocated cossacks became known as Sloboda Cossacks. There were five regimental districts (polky) of Sloboda Cossacks, named after the towns of their sustained deployment, and subdivided into company districts (sotni). Regional centers included Ostrogozhsk, Kharkiv, Okhtyrka, Sumy, and Izyum, while the Sloboda Ukraine Cossack capital was located in Sumy until 1743.

The administration of Catherine the Great disbanded the regiments of Slobozhanshchina and abolished Cossack privileges by the decree of July 28, 1765. The semiautonomous region became a province called Sloboda Ukraine Governorate (Slobodsko-Ukrainskaya guberniya). Saint Petersburg replaced the regimental administrations with Russian hussar regiments, and granted Cossack higher ranks (starshinas) officership and nobility (dvoryanstvo). In 1780, the governorate was transformed into the Kharkov Viceroyalty (namestnichestvo) which existed until the end of 1796, when it was again renamed into Sloboda Ukrainian Governorate. Each administrative reform involved territorial changes.

In 1835, the province of Sloboda Ukraine was abolished, ceding most of its territory to the new Kharkov Governorate, and some to Voronezh and Kursk, which came under the Little Russian General Governorship of Left-bank Ukraine.

After the establishment of the Soviet Union Sloboda Ukraine was divided between the Ukrainian SSR and the Russian SFSR. The early 1930s saw the end to Ukrainization in the parts of Sloboda Ukraine located in the Russian SFSR, which led to a massive decline of reported Ukrainians in these regions in the 1937 Soviet Census compared to the 1926 First All-Union Census of the Soviet Union. The Ukrainian SSR reorganized their part of the region several times before establishing the borders of present-day Kharkiv Oblast in 1932.

References

External links
 Sloboda in the Encyclopedia of Ukraine
 The autonomous hetman state and Sloboda Ukraine in the Encyclopædia Britannica

Further reading
 Bibliography of Russian history
 Bibliography of Ukrainian history
 List of Slavic studies journals

 
Historical regions in Ukraine
Historical regions in Russia
Zaporozhian Host
17th-century establishments in Ukraine
Divided regions